Palmadusta ziczac is a species of sea snail, a cowry, a marine gastropod mollusk in the family Cypraeidae, the cowries.

Subspecies and formae 
Palmadusta ziczac misella (Perry, 1811) 
Palmadusta ziczac ziczac signata (f)  Iredale, 1939: synonym of Palmadusta ziczac (Linnaeus, 1758) 
Palmadusta ziczac ziczac undata (f) (Linnaeus, 1758): synonym of Palmadusta ziczac (Linnaeus, 1758) 
Palmadusta ziczac vittata (Deshayes, 1831)

Description
The basic color of these pyriform shells is light beige or light tan, crossed by three transversal white bands with a zigzag pattern. The base of the shell is yellow or orange-brown with some brown small spots, extended along both sides. The aperture is orange with several short teeth. In the living cowries the mantle is orange-red, with white papillae.

Distribution
[[File:Wyst-ziczac.jpg|thumb|right|Distribution map of Palmadusta ziczac]]
This species is distributed in the Red Sea and in the Indian Ocean along Aldabra, Chagos, the Comores, the East Coast of South Africa, Kenya, Madagascar, the Mascarene Basin, Mauritius, Mozambique, Réunion, the Seychelles, Somalia, and Tanzania and in the western Pacific Ocean along Melanesia, Bali, Philippines, Australia and Polynesia, except Hawaii.

Habitat

References

 Verdcourt, B. (1954). The cowries of the East African Coast (Kenya, Tanganyika, Zanzibar and Pemba). Journal of the East Africa Natural History Society 22(4) 96: 129-144, 17 pls
 Burgess, C.M. (1970). The Living Cowries. AS Barnes and Co, Ltd. Cranbury, New Jersey
 Steyn, D.G. & Lussi, M. (1998) Marine Shells of South Africa. An Illustrated Collector's Guide to Beached Shells. Ekogilde Publishers, Hartebeespoort, South Africa, ii + 264 pp. page(s): 66

External links
 Biolib
 Underwater
 Flmnh

Cypraeidae
Gastropods described in 1758
Taxa named by Carl Linnaeus